Shane Laloata (born 8 December 1977) is a professional rugby football player. He represented Samoa in rugby league.

Rugby League career

Playing career
In 1999 Laloata was with the Newcastle Knights, and played in the NSWRL Premier League. He then moved to the North-Nelson Bay Marlins in the Newcastle Rugby League in 2000.

In 2002 Laloata played for the St. George Illawarra Dragons in the National Rugby League. He played for the Knights NSWRL Premier League side in 2003.

Representative career
Laloata played for Samoa in the 2000 World Cup.

Rugby union career
By 2005 Laloata had switched to rugby union, and was playing for the Warringah Rugby Club in the Tooheys New Cup.

He moved to the Newcastle and Hunter Rugby Union competition in 2007, before heading north to Brisbane in 2008. However he returned to Newcastle in 2009, playing for Nelson Bay before switching to Merewether Carlton in 2010.

References

1977 births
Living people
Samoan rugby league players
Nelson Bay Blues players
Samoa national rugby league team players
St. George Illawarra Dragons players
Samoan rugby union players
Rugby league centres
Rugby league wingers